Vilas is an unincorporated community in Watauga County, North Carolina, United States. The Vilas post office, with ZIP code 28692, was established in 1885.

Notable residents
Joseph Bathanti (born 1953), an American poet, novelist and professor

References

Unincorporated communities in Watauga County, North Carolina
Unincorporated communities in North Carolina